Jaiyeola Aduke Alakija (March 1921 – March 2016) was a Nigerian welfare officer, lawyer and diplomat who was the country's ambassador to Sweden from 1984 to 1987. She was also a former president of the International Federation of Women Lawyers.

Life
Alakija was born to the family of Adeyemo Alakija, she was the only daughter and last child of her father's first marriage. She started her education at the Claxton House School, Marina, Lagos but left for Wales in 1930 and finished her secondary school at Penrhos College, North Wales. She initially wanted to study medicine at Glasgow University but then transferred to the London School of Economics to study social science. On returning to Nigeria, she worked as a welfare officer in the Lagos judiciary. There she initiated the creation of a juvenile court and caused the establishment of a number of girls clubs in Lagos, as well as assisting in the formation of the Lagos branch of the British Leprosy Relief Association.  In 1949, she left Nigeria to study law, qualifying as a barrister in 1953. Thereafter, she set up a law practice with Miss Gloria Rhodes and worked in the chambers of John Idowu Conrad Taylor. She briefly left law to work as a Social Welfare Officer, becoming the first African woman to hold the position in Nigeria.

In Alakija's professional career, she was an assistant to the general manager of Mobil Oil, and later became a director and legal advisor to Mobil Oil Nigeria in 1957. In 1961, Mobil won a concession for oil exploration in Nigeria, and Alakija later became a director in this new venture. In 1967, she was the executive secretary of the Lagos State Chamber of Commerce. From 1961 to 1965, she was a member of Nigeria's delegation to the United Nations.

Alakija was a co-founder of New Era Girls College, a member of the International Women Society of Nigeria and member of Soroptimist International.

She held an honorary degree from Barnard College.

References

1921 births
2016 deaths
Nigerian women lawyers
Nigerian women diplomats
Ambassadors of Nigeria to Sweden
Alumni of the London School of Economics
20th-century Nigerian lawyers
Lawyers from Lagos
Nigerian expatriates in the United Kingdom
Founders of Nigerian schools and colleges
History of women in Lagos
Aduke
Nigerian women ambassadors
20th-century Nigerian women
Nigerian social workers
20th-century women lawyers
Yoruba people